The Ravine River is a  stream on the Upper Peninsula of Michigan in the United States.

References 

Rivers of Michigan
Rivers of Baraga County, Michigan
Tributaries of Lake Superior